The State Government and the Local Government are the two levels of government in Enugu State in Nigeria.

The governor is above a group of commissioners who he has placed as heads of ministries that oversee various portfolios. Both the governor and the commissioners form the Executive Council of Enugu State.

Agencies in Enugu state 
 Enugu State Emergency Management
 Volunteer Service Agency
 Enugu State Agency for the control of Aids (ENSACA)
 Project Development and Implementation Unit
 Enugu State Solid Waste Management Authority
 Enugu SERVICOM
 Boundary Adjustment Committee
 Enugu State Management Company
 Nigeria Construction and Furniture Company
 Small and Medium Enterprise Development
 Emene Floor Mill
 Orba Market Development Authority
 State Industrial Estate Management Board
 Niger Gas Company Limited
 Enugu State Vegetable Oil Products Limited
 Niger steel Company Limited
 Aluminium Factory Ohebe Dim
 State Tourism Board
 Nike Lake Resort Hotel
 Presidential Hotel
 Ikenga Hotel Nsukka
 Examination Development Centre
 Post Primary School Management Board
 State Universal University Science and Technology
 Enugu State Scholarship and Education Loans board
 Education Resource Centre
 Oji River Special Centre
 Ogbete Special Education Centre
 Agency for Mass Literacy
 Institute of Management and Technology Enugu
 Enugu State College of Education (Technical)
 State Science, Technical and Vocational Education Management Board
 State Library Board
 Army Recruitment Centre
 Muslim Pilgrim Board
 Christian Pilgrim Welfare Board
 Enugu State Community Resource Centre.
 Veterinary School, Achi
 Tractor Hiring Services
 Fertilizer Procurement Distribution Company
 United Palm Product Limited (UPPL)
 ADARICE Production Company
 ENADEP
 Statement Premier Cashew Industry
 Grains Production Agency
 College of Agriculture and Agro Entrepreneurial Studies
 Traditional Rulers Council
 Examination Development Centre
 Post Primary School Management Board
 State Universal University Science and Technology
 Enugu State Scholarship and Education Loans board
 Education Resource Centre
 Oji River Special Centre
 Ogbete Special Education Centre
 Agency for Mass Literacy
 Institute of Management and Technology Enugu
 Enugu State College of Education (Technical)
 State Science, Technical and Vocational Education Management Board
 State Library Board
 Enugu State Forestry Commission
 Board of Internal Revenue
 State Gaming Commission Orientation Insurance Company
 Ministry of Finance Incorporation
 State Health Board
 District Health Boards
 ESUT Specialist Hospital, Park Lane
 School of Health Technology
 School of Midwifery
 Traditional Medicine Board
 Local Health Authority
 State Housing Development Corporation
 State Cooperative College
 Vocational Rehabilitation Centre, Emene
 State Approved School, Ngwo
 Remand Home, Akwuke
 ESBS/TV
 Enugu State Printing Publishing Corp
 Advisory Council on Prerogative of Mercy
 Justice Reforms
 Enugu Citizens Right and Mediation Centre
 Administrator-General/Public Trustee
 Community Development Project (Enugu State Assisted)
 Rural Electrification Board
 Enugu State Fire Service
 Agency for Community and Social Development
 Rural Development Fund (Management)
 Raw Material Display Centre
 ICT Agency
 Enugu State Transport Company (ENTRACO)
 Enugu State Traffic Management Authority
 Enugu State Rural Water supply and Sanitation Agency
 Enugu State water Corporation
 Small Towns Water and Sanitation Agency
 Pre-stressing Concrete Company Limited
 Nigerian Construction and Furniture Company (NCFC)
 Enugu State Road Maintenance
 Rangers Management Corporation
 Awgu Games council
 State Sports Council

Executive Members

References

Enugu
Enugu State